The name Kitty has been used for three tropical cyclones worldwide: one in the Northwestern Pacific Ocean, one in the South-West Indian Ocean and one in the Southwestern Pacific Ocean.

In the Northwestern Pacific:
 Typhoon Kitty (T4910) – struck Japan after Typhoon Judith.

In the South-West Indian:
 Cyclone Kitty (1973)

In the Southwestern Pacific:
 Cyclone Kitty (1971)

Pacific typhoon set index articles
South-West Indian Ocean cyclone set index articles
Australian region cyclone set index articles